Dolores Amaya (born 16 April 1980) is an Argentine rower. She competed in the women's double sculls event at the 1996 Summer Olympics. Aged 16, she was Argentina's youngest rowing competitor at the 1996 Olympics.

References

External links

1980 births
Living people
Argentine female rowers
Olympic rowers of Argentina
Rowers at the 1996 Summer Olympics
Place of birth missing (living people)
21st-century Argentine women